Past Life Trauma (1985–1992) is a compilation album by German thrash metal band Kreator, compiled by lead singer/guitarist Mille Petrozza. It was released in 2000 by Noise Records. Tracks are taken from the albums recorded between 1985 (Endless Pain) and 1992 (Renewal) . Track 5, 8, 9 and 15 are rare tracks.

Track listing 
 "Betrayer" (from Extreme Aggression) – 4:00
 "Pleasure to Kill" (from Pleasure to Kill) – 4:10
 "When the Sun Burns Red" (from Coma of Souls) – 5:31
 "Endless Pain" (from Endless Pain) – 3:31
 "Winter Martyrium" (live in Lichtenfels) – 6:12
 "Flag of Hate" (from Endless Pain) – 3:55
 "Extreme Aggression" (from Extreme Aggression) – 4:43
 "After the Attack" – 3:44 (Previously Only Available on Sounds•Waves 1 a 4 Track 7" EP free with Sounds Magazine in 1988)
 "Trauma" (from Renewal demo) – 5:11
 "People of the Lie" (from Coma of Souls) – 3:16
 "Renewal" (from Renewal) – 4:33
 "Terrible Certainty" (from Terrible Certainty) – 4:28
 "Love Us or Hate Us" (from Extreme Aggression) – 3:43
 "Total Death" (from Endless Pain) – 3:26
 "Europe After the Rain" (live) – 4:26
 "Under the Guillotine" (from Pleasure to Kill) – 4:39
 "Terror Zone" (from Coma of Souls) – 5:55
 "Tormentor" (from Endless Pain) – 2:55

Credits 
Mille Petrozza – vocals, rhythm guitar, liner notes, compilation
Frank "Blackfire" Gosdzik – lead guitar
Roberto "Rob" Fioretti – bass
Jürgen "Ventor" Reil – drums, additional vocals
Jörg "Tritze" Trzebiatowski – lead guitar (tracks 1, 7, 12 & 13)
Kreator – photography
Maren/Noise Graphics – design
Andreas Marschall – cover art
Harry Pilkerton – photography
Digitally remastered at TTM Mastering, Berlin, Germany in March 2000

References

External links
 Kreator terrorzone: Past Life Trauma (1985-1992)

2000 compilation albums
Kreator albums
Noise Records compilation albums
Thrash metal compilation albums